Balstad is a surname. Notable people with the surname include:

Inga Balstad (born 1952), Norwegian politician
Jan Balstad (born 1937), Norwegian labour leader and politician

See also
Ballstad

Norwegian-language surnames